Brandon is a town and civil parish in the English county of Suffolk.
Brandon is located in the Breckland area of Suffolk, close to the adjoining county of Norfolk. It lies between the towns of Bury St Edmunds, Thetford, Mildenhall, Downham Market and the city of Ely. It lies next to Thetford Forest Park.

History 
According to Eilert Ekwall (The Concise Oxford Dictionary of English Place-Names) the likely origin of the name is "Brandon, usually 'hill where broom grows'", the earliest known spelling being in the 11th century when the town, gradually expanding up and along the rising ground of the river valley, was called Bromdun.

From prehistoric times the area was mined for flint as can be seen at Grimes Graves, a popular Brandon tourist destination. Much more recently, the town was a major centre for the production of gunflints.

The Domesday Book records that the manor of Brandon in 1086 had 25 households. In medieval times and beyond Brandon was renowned for its rabbit fur.

On 14 May 1789, the town suffered a Great Fire, a report of which can be found at the Brandon Heritage Centre. While all the young men were away at a fair day in nearby Thetford, a fire caused by a lightning strike set fire to the surgeon's house which quickly spread to the surrounding properties. Eleven houses were damaged and 8 of them were completely destroyed. The hardest hit was Francis Diggon, the saddler, who lost all of his property and possessions, costing a total of 381 pounds, 2 shillings.
In 1810 Joseph Smedley was hiring a building for use as a theatre at a cost of five Guineas.

Cinema
Brandon's first cinema was brought to the town by Stanley Lingwood toward the end of 1917.  Stanley had just been pensioned out of the Army due receiving a very severe hand wound at The Somme and his father, a wealthy furrier in the town named Palmer Lingwood, died that same time.  He purchased the cinema from Shropshire and erected it between the family home, Avenue House, and the Church Institute, along Victoria Avenue.  It was a wooden building and he named the cinema 'Electric Palace', and it stayed in his possession until December 1933 when he sold it to a King's Lynn businessman named Ben Culey, who had a cinema in neighbouring Thetford.  Six months after Ben purchased the cinema it burnt to the ground in a mysterious fire and in February 1935 he opened another cinema on the site of the burned down one, which he named 'AVENUE'.

This new cinema was state of the art with the very latest projector, sound and acoustics, and the building proved very popular during the Second World War.  The building was later transformed into a bingo hall but had become derelict over a number of years. It has since been demolished.

Present-day 
The town's population was recorded as 9,636 people in the 2011 UK Census. Brandon has three schools; two primary, Forest Academy and Glade Academy; and one High School, Breckland School.

Brandon's population has steadily increased since the Second World War due to immigration. After the war, there was an influx of servicemen from Poland who settled in the town and also in nearby Weeting, Norfolk. The Cold War saw many American service people and their families billeted in and around the town. The Greater London Council oversaw the building of a large Council estate off Thetford Road and Bury Road in the 1970s and many London families were relocated to Brandon during that time.

The town is home to Brandon Country Park and a short distance from High Lodge which hosts musical gigs in the summer.

In 2014 a voluntary group "Brandon in Bloom"  later " Brandon in Bloom CIC " was established to green up the open spaces around the town. In 2018 the group was awarded Silver Gilt and Best New Comer in the Anglia in Bloom annual awards, followed by Gold in 2019. Bloom judging ceased during the lockdown period, upon restarting in 2022 Brandon managed gold and best in class for the Jubilee Display, gold for the Friendly Bench and George St Rose garden. The town classification once again all achieved gold and also picked up Best Town in its class for Anglia in Bloom 2022.

Religious buildings

The church of St Peter is a Grade I listed building of medieval origin, restored in 1873.

The Baptist church is sited in the High Street. Behind the church is a schoolroom used for meetings other than worship.

Sport 
Brandon has a thriving football junior club for ages 5 years up to under 16. The Brandon Lads and Lasses A.F.C has squads of boys and girls competing in the Ipswich & Suffolk Youth League, South Norfolk Youth League, Mid Norfolk Youth League.

Brandon has a lawn bowls club, Brandon Town Bowling Club, which plays outdoors in the summer.

Transport 

Brandon is situated on the A1065 Mildenhall to Fakenham road. It often suffers severe congestion due to large amounts of commuter traffic, holiday traffic travelling to the Norfolk Coast and HGVs.  Several bus routes pass through the town as well.

Brandon railway station has an hourly service to Cambridge and Ely to the West and to Thetford and Norwich in the East.

Regular bus services operate from Brandon to the neighbouring towns of Bury St. Edmunds, Mildenhall and Thetford. There are also infrequent services (at school and shopping times) to Downham Market, King's Lynn and Norwich.

Flowing in an easterly direction the Little Ouse river is navigable through the town.

See also
 Brandon Country Park

References

External links 

 

 
Towns in Suffolk
Civil parishes in Suffolk
Forest Heath